Marcy Morrison (born 1935) is a former county commissioner, state legislator, and mayor in Colorado. She is a Republican and has described herself as a Rockefeller Republican.

Biography
Morrison was born in New York and later moved to Colorado with her husband. After they moved to Manitou Springs, they had children. She became a member of the League of Women Voters and the Sisterhood of Temple Shalom.

Morrison began her career as a volunteer at a local library and joined the library board. She was then elected to the school board and served from 1973 to 1984. In 1984, she became the first woman elected as El Paso County Commissioner. She served as commissioner until 1988.

From 1988 to 2000, she was a State Representative for El Paso County. While a state representative, she was the chair of the House health committee from 1992 to 2000. In 2001, she was elected mayor of Manitou Springs and served for six years.

In 2007, Colorado Governor Bill Ritter appointed her the commissioner of the Colorado Division of Insurance, and she served until 2010. She later became CEO of the iManitou department for the City of Manitou Springs.

Honors
In 2021, Morrison was honored in a dedication ceremony for the Beckers Lane Bridge. In 2022, she was honored as a "superwoman" by the League of Women Voters of the Pikes Peak Region.

References

Republican Party members of the Colorado House of Representatives
20th-century American politicians
21st-century American politicians
1935 births
Living people
21st-century American women politicians
Women state legislators in Colorado
County commissioners in Colorado
School board members in Colorado
Women mayors of places in Colorado
People from Manitou Springs, Colorado
State insurance commissioners of the United States
20th-century American women politicians